"'The Robin Flies at Dawn" is a special edition of the British sitcom Only Fools and Horses, filmed specifically for the British troops serving in the 1990–91 Gulf War. It has never been broadcast commercially. The episode was filmed at RAF Strike Command in High Wycombe, with all concerned giving up their time for free for the one-day shoot."It was great fun and after we finished filming they laid on a buffet for us" recalled John Sullivan in the book 'Only Fools and Horses – The Official Inside Story'.

Synopsis
Shot in the style of a home movie, the episode sees Del Boy (with a folder marked "Top Secret" under his arm), Rodney and Uncle Albert addressing the troops from a "secret location in Southern England" (shortly revealed by Rodney to be High Wycombe). Their yellow Reliant Regal van has been kitted out with a Union Jack, camouflage and a machine gun and Del suggests that it can be the alliance's secret weapon. Also present are many of the troops' wives, whom Del and Rodney assure the viewers they will take care of. The scene ends with an appreciative message to the troops.

Episode cast

External links
 Google ebook

1990 British television episodes
Only Fools and Horses special episodes
Propaganda by war
Propaganda in the United Kingdom
Propaganda television broadcasts